SEK (Sidirodromoi Ellinikou Kratous, Hellenic State Railways) Class Θβ (or Class THb; Theta-beta) is a class of two 2-8-0 steam locomotives acquired after the First World War.

Originally one of the Bulgarian State Railways' (BDŽ) 800 series four-cylinder compound locomotives that had been built by Henschel & Sohn in 1912 as BDŽ 806 and 811. They were given the class letters "Θβ" by the SEK and initially numbered 621 and 622 before being renumbered 521 and 522.

During World War II, they were reclaimed by the Bulgarians and renumbered BDŽ 17.72 and 17.73 at the end of the surviving 800s (which by then had become BDŽ class 17).

Notes

References

Θβ
2-8-0 locomotives
Henschel locomotives
Steam locomotives of Greece
Standard gauge locomotives of Greece
Compound locomotives